Oleksiy Khomenko (born 28 August 1994) is a Ukrainian football midfielder who currently plays for amateur club FC Munkach Mukachevo.

Khomenko is a product of the FC Molod Poltava Youth Sportive School System. In 2013, he signed a contract with FC Hoverla, but played only in the FC Hoverla Uzhhorod reserves. In the main-team squad he made his debut playing as a substituted player in the match against FC Dynamo Kyiv on 16 April 2016 in the Ukrainian Premier League.

References

External links
Profile at FFU Official Site (Ukr)

1994 births
Living people
Ukrainian footballers
FC Hoverla Uzhhorod players
Ukrainian Premier League players

Association football midfielders